Night Stalker(s) or Nightstalker(s) may refer to:

Criminals 
 Richard Ramirez (1960–2013), serial killer whose murder spree in California in the mid-1980s led to him being known as the "Night Stalker"
 Joseph James DeAngelo (known as the "Original Night Stalker"), serial killer and rapist who operated in Southern California from the late-1970s to mid-1980s
 Delroy Easton Grant, a serial rapist who operated in London during the 1990s and 2000s, sometimes referred to by the British media as the "Night Stalker"

Arts and entertainment

Film and television
 The Night Stalker (1972 film), a 1972 made-for-television movie starring Darren McGavin
 Kolchak: The Night Stalker, a 1974 television series based on the movie, starring Darren McGavin
 Night Stalker (TV series), a 2005 remake of the original Kolchak series
 The Night Stalker (1987 film), a 1987 horror film starring Charles Napier
 Nightstalker (film), a 2002 horror film directed by Chris Fisher
 Nightstalker, a 2009 horror film directed by Ulli Lommel
 The Night Stalker (2016 film), a 2016 psychological thriller directed by Megan Griffiths and starring Lou Diamond Phillips
 Night Stalker: The Hunt For a Serial Killer, a 2021 Netflix documentary miniseries

Literature
 Nightstalkers (comics), a horror fiction comic book
 The Night Stalker, a book by James Swain
 The Night Stalkers, a book by Michael Durant and Steven Hartov about the U.S. Army's 160th Special Operations Aviation Regiment

Music
 Nightstalker (band), a Greek stoner rock band
 "Nightstalker", song from the 1993 album Sinister Slaughter by extreme metal band Macabre
 Sleepwalker (The Kinks song), a song whose course repeats the phrase "night stalker."
 Night Stalkers (song), a 2022 song by Megadeth

Other media
 Night Stalker (video game), a 1982 video game for the Intellivision
 Bryan Clark (born 1964), professional wrestler known as The Nightstalker
 Nightstalker, an alternative character class in Dungeons and Dragons
 A species of predatory flightless bat in the book After Man by Dougal Dixon

Other uses 
 160th Special Operations Aviation Regiment (Airborne), a United States Army unit nicknamed the "Night Stalkers"

See also 

 
 
 
 
 
 
 Darkstalkers
 Night Prowler (disambiguation)